General elections were held in Northern Rhodesia on 22 May 1926 to elect the Legislative Council for the first time. A further four members were appointed by the Governor in September 1926.

Electoral system
The Legislative Council Ordinance 1925 published in June 1925 provided for the election of members to the Legislative Council, which had been established in 1924. Five constituencies were created; Eastern, Livingstone and Western, Midland, Northern and Southern. Voting was restricted to British subjects, with suffrage granted to men aged 21 or over and women aged 25 or over, as long as they had lived in their constituency for at least six months and had property worth £250 or an annual salary of at least £200. There were a total of 1,036 registered voters.

Campaign
In two constituencies, Eastern and Livingstone and Western, there was only one candidate, both of whom were elected unopposed. Two candidates ran in Northern and Southern, whilst three ran in Midland.

Results

References

1926
1926 elections in Africa
1926 in Northern Rhodesia
1926